Michael O'Neal Covea Uzcátegui (born 21 August 1993 in Caracas, Venezuela) is a Venezuelan professional footballer who plays as a midfielder for Argentine Primera División club Rosario Central.

Teams
 Deportivo Petare 2011–2013
 San Martín de San Juan 2013–2016
 Deportivo La Guaira 2017
 Club Olimpo 2017–2018
 Mineros de Guayana 2018–2021
 Deportivo Tachira 2021
 Rosario Central 2021–

References
 
 

1993 births
Living people
Footballers from Caracas
Venezuelan footballers
Association football midfielders
Venezuelan Primera División players
Argentine Primera División players
Primera Nacional players
Deportivo Miranda F.C. players
San Martín de San Juan footballers
Olimpo footballers
A.C.C.D. Mineros de Guayana players
Deportivo Táchira F.C.
Rosario Central footballers
Venezuelan expatriate footballers
Venezuelan expatriate sportspeople in Argentina
Expatriate footballers in Argentina
20th-century Venezuelan people
21st-century Venezuelan people